The Orphanage is a 2019 Danish-Afghan drama film directed by Shahrbanoo Sadat. It was screened in the Directors' Fortnight section at the 2019 Cannes Film Festival. It is the second installment in a planned pentalogy based on the unpublished diaries of Anwar Hashimi, who plays a supporting character in the film. Its prequel, Wolf and Sheep, came out in 2016.

Plot
The film follows the 15-year-old Qodrat (Qodratollah Qadiri), who at the beginning of the movie lives on the streets of 1989 Kabul and gets by on scalping cinema tickets and peddling key rings. After being picked up from the streets he is sent to the Soviet operated juvenile detention center known as "the orphanage". Here he is one of five new arrivals, along with 14-year-old Masihullah (Masihullah Feraji) and his 16-year-old nephew Fayez (Ahmad Fayaz Osmani) who are given regular meals, living quarters, a primary education. The audience is introduced to the inner life of the stony faced Qodrat in Bollywood-style dream sequences in which he is free to express his feelings for a girl in class or one of his close pals. Dorm-room power scuffles ensue, sometimes broken up by the director Anwar (Anwar Hashimi), who takes on a father-like role. Some of the boys are taken on an excursion to Moscow where they get to compete in chess with their fellow young comrades. This life is again upturned when teachers struggle to toe the line of the Mujahideen after the Soviets withdraw from Afghanistan.

Cast

Hasibullah Rasooli
Masihullah Feraji
Qodratollah Qadiri
Sediqa Rasuli
Anwar Hashimi
Ehasanulla Kharoty

Reception
Jay Weissberg of Variety magazine called The Orphanage a "clumsy Bollywood re-creation" that "add[s] significant flavor". Peter Bradshaw of The Guardian, called the film "energetic and captivating drama".

References

External links

2019 drama films
Danish drama films
Afghan drama films